The Benares Bank (1844) was a bank founded in the year 1844 in British India. The bank became defunct in the year 1850 with the winding down of its operations. The bank was notable for being the twenty eighth oldest bank in India.

History

Founding  

The Benares Bank was founded in 1844 in Varanasi, India.

The bank largely served the customers of the United Provinces, which today corresponds to the Uttar Pradesh state of India.

Management 

The bank was staffed by mostly British nationals who were drawn mainly from the East India Company.

The bank was headquartered in the Varanasi city in the United Provinces.

Final years 

In 1849, the bank was on the verge of failure.

The bank was finally closed in the year 1850.

Legacy 

The bank is notable for being the twenty eighth oldest bank in India.

The bank played a key role in the history of Banking in India.

See also

Indian banking
List of banks in India

References

External links
 History of the bank by the Reserve Bank of India
 History of the Bank
 Book by Charles Northcote Cooke

Defunct banks of India
Companies based in Uttar Pradesh
Banks established in 1844